Werner may refer to:

People
 Werner (name), origin of the name and people with this name as surname and given name

Fictional characters
 Werner (comics), a German comic book character
 Werner Von Croy, a fictional character in the Tomb Raider series
 Werner von Strucker, a fictional character in the Marvel Comics universe
 Werner, a fictional character in Darwin's Soldiers
 Werner Ziegler, a fictional character from tv show Better Call Saul

Geography
Werner, West Virginia
 Mount Werner, a mountain that includes the Steamboat Ski Resort, in the Park Range of Colorado
 Werner (crater), a crater in the south-central highlands of the Moon
 Werner projection, an equal-area map projection preserving distances along parallels, central meridian and from the North pole

Companies
 Carsey-Werner, an American television and film production studio
 Werner Enterprises, a Nebraska-based trucking company
 Werner Co., a manufacturer of ladders
 Werner Motors, an early automobile manufacturer

Other uses
 Werner (cycling team), a Spanish road-racing team 1969–1972
 Werner, an 1822 work by Lord Byron
 Werner Park, a baseball stadium near Omaha, Nebraska named for Werner Enterprises
 Werner state, a quantum state

See also
 Wernher (disambiguation)